CSI-All Saints Church is a church under the auspices of the Church of South India. It is located in the Trimulgherry locality of Secunderabad. It was originally a Garrison Church, presided by Army Chaplains but was subsequently bequeathed to the Church of South India, a uniting Church in 1947. The church currently serves the Tamil speaking congregation of Secunderabad and offers services in English every week and in Tamil every week.

History
All Saints Church was constructed in 1860 AD to serve the British Cantonment of Secunderabad. The church was the first permanent structure in the Trimulgherry Entrenchment.

Architecture
The church is an imposing Gothic structure with a multitude of turrets and a tower belfry. The altar piece of the church is a beautiful stained glass window depicting Jesus carrying the cross. The stained glass window is dated 1884 and dedicated to the memory of Edward Dawson, Lieutenant of Royal Artillery. Sixteen memorial tablets along the walls of the church describe the various British officers that lived and died at Secunderabad.

Antique pews, lamps along with a baptismal font are some of the prized possessions of the church. The church received the INTACH Heritage award from the Government of Andhra Pradesh from good maintenance.

Queen's visit
In 1983, Queen Elizabeth II visited the church The Queen also visited the nearby Holy Trinity Church, Bolarum where she celebrated her 36th wedding anniversary along with Prince Philip in a service led by Bishop Victor Premasagar.

Worship Services
All Sundays : 7:30 Am Holy Communion Service in English
All Sundays: 9:00 Am Holy Communion Service in Tamil 
All Sundays: 7:00 Pm English Evensong Holy Communion Service

See also
List of churches in Secunderabad and Hyderabad
Holy Trinity Church, Bolarum

References

Church of South India church buildings in India
Churches in Secunderabad
Churches in Hyderabad, India
Churches completed in 1860